Coming Home is the eighth studio album by the Swedish industrial metal project Pain, released on 9 September 2016 via Nuclear Blast Records.

Track listing

Charts

References

Pain (musical project) albums
2016 albums
Nuclear Blast albums
Albums produced by Peter Tägtgren